J-Six Ranchettes is an unincorporated community and census-designated place (CDP) in Pima County, Arizona, United States. It was first listed as a CDP prior to the 2020 census.

Demographics

References 

Census-designated places in Pima County, Arizona